Abdullah Al-Meqbas (born 13 January 1996) is a Saudi Arabian footballer who plays for Al-Shaeib as a striker.

External links

References

Living people
1996 births
Saudi Arabian footballers
Association football forwards
Al-Shabab FC (Riyadh) players
Al-Kawkab FC players
Damac FC players
Al-Taqadom FC players
Al-Mujazzal Club players
Al-Shoulla FC players
Al Shaeib Club players
Saudi Professional League players
Saudi First Division League players
Saudi Second Division players